Prahova may refer to:

 Prahova (river), Romania
 Prahova Valley, Romania
 Prahova County, named after the river Prahova, Romania
 Prahova Ploieşti, a football club based in Ploieşti, Romania
 Stadionul Prahova, a football-only stadium in Ploieşti, Romania

See also
 Prahovo, a village in the municipality of Negotin, Serbia